Gutiérrez Zamora is a city in the Mexican state of Veracruz. Gutiérrez Zamora is bordered by Papantla, Tuxpan, Poza Rica and Coatzintla, and it is served by both the railway and Federal Highways 180 and 190.

It was named in honour of  Manuel Gutiérrez Zamora, a native of the port of Veracruz who served as  governor of the state in the mid-19th century.

External links 
  Municipal Official Site
  Municipal Official Information

Populated places in Veracruz